Burton Salmon is a village and civil parish in the Selby district of North Yorkshire, England, close to the border with West Yorkshire, and approximately  north from Knottingley, on the A162 road.  According to the 2001 Census the parish had a population of 419, reducing slightly to 416 at the 2011 Census.

It was historically part of the West Riding of Yorkshire until 1974.

The village primary school is Burton Salmon Community Primary School. There is also a public house, The Plough Inn, dating from the 17th century, and a Methodist chapel.

Toponymy
The place name "Burton Salmon" is formed of two elements. The first originates in Old English and translates as "farmstead of the Britons" (Brettas, genitive Bretta) plus the word tūn, meaning "farmstead, village, settlement". The second element, "Salmon" is a manorial affix, derived from the name Salamone, that of a  man who held lands in the area in the 13th century. Although not mentioned in the Domesday Book, the village was recorded as Brettona circa 1160, before the name of the estate holder was appended, and again as Burton Salamon in 1516.

References

External links 

Burton Salmon Community Primary School
Hillam News
"Rural Pursuits and Farming in the Fifties", YouTube video
Burton Salmon Parish Council website 

Civil parishes in North Yorkshire
Selby District
Villages in North Yorkshire